The Confederation of Tribal Associations of Katanga (or CONAKAT) was one of the main political parties in the Belgian Congo and was led by the pro-Western regionalist Moïse Tshombe and his interior minister, Godefroid Munongo. It became the ruling party of the State of Katanga whose declaration of independence sparked the Congo Crisis.

History

Formation
The Confédération des associations tribales du Katanga was formed in November 1958 by Tshombe, Munongo, Dominique Diur, and others in response to the developing sociopolitical situation in Katanga Province, Belgian Congo. At the time, immigrants from other parts of the Congo, notably Lulua and Baluba people of Kasai Province, made up 38% of Katanga's population. The "authentic Katangese" referred to them disparagingly as "strangers".   

The first president of CONAKAT was Munongo, who was quickly forced to cede leadership to Tshombe due to his work in the civil service.
The CONAKAT ran in the national elections of 1959 on a regionalist program (including the demand for Katanga's self-government and preferential tax treatment). The party won only 8 of the 137 Congolese parliament seats in 1959.

On July 11, 1960, just under a fortnight after Congolese independence, CONAKAT president Tshombe declared the independence of the State of Katanga and the beginning of the Congo Crisis.

State of Katanga
CONAKAT became the dominant ruling party of the State of Katanga as it held 58 of the 64 seats in the National Assembly and the majority of cabinet positions.

The party ruled Katanga until 1963 when it was forced to surrender in the face of overwhelming UN and Congolese opposition.

Following the surrender
In 1965 following the re-annexation of Katanga into the Democratic Republic of Congo Tshombe became Prime Minister of the Congo and Munongo became Minister of the Interior. In the 1965 general election CONAKAT came second, receiving more than 178 thousand votes, 7.2% of the total vote. The party gained  9 seats in the National Assembly and was allied with the nationwide CONACO alliance led by Prime Minister Tshombe. The alliance won 80 seats but despite this Évariste Kimba, a former CONAKAT member but now Congolese Democratic Front leader, was appointed Prime Minister.

Joseph Mobutu seized power in a coup in November 1965 and would transform the Congo into a one-party state under his Popular Movement of the Revolution which forcibly dissolved CONAKAT along with every other political party.

Citations

References

Political parties established in the 1950s 
Defunct political parties in the Democratic Republic of the Congo
History of Katanga
Anti-communist parties
Belgian Congo